Ryu Su-young (born Eo Nam-seon on September 5, 1979) is a South Korean actor. He made his first appearance on television as a college student on a cooking show in 1998, then starred in the controversial film Summertime (2001). This was followed by supporting roles in TV dramas such as Successful Story of a Bright Girl (2002), Save the Last Dance for Me (2004), and Lawyers of the Great Republic Korea (2008), as well as leading roles in 18 vs. 29 (2005), Seoul 1945 (2006), and Bad Couple (2007).

For his mandatory military service, Ryu was a member of the Seoul Metropolitan Police Agency from 2008 to 2010. After his discharge, Ryu returned to television in 2011 in the romantic comedy My Princess, and the popular family drama Ojakgyo Family. In 2013, he joined the reality/variety show Real Men, in which male celebrities visit army bases and experience daily life there. He also played a detective chasing a fugitive in Two Weeks (2013).

Personal life
Ryu Soo-young married his fellow actress, Park Ha-sun, in a private ceremony at the Mayfield Hotel in Seoul on January 22, 2017. Their romantic relationship started in 2014. They also worked together in the television drama Two Weeks (2013).

They welcomed their first child, a daughter, in August 2017.

Philanthropy 
On March 15, 2022, Ryu made a donation  million to the Hope Bridge Disaster Relief Association along with Park Ha-sun to help those who have been damaged by the massive wildfire that started in Uljin, Gyeongbuk and has continued to spread. Samcheok, Gangwon.

Filmography

Film

Television series

Web series

Television show

Web shows

Radio shows

Music Video

Awards and nominations

State honors

Notes

References

External links
 Ryu Soo-young at Will Entertainment 
 
 
 

South Korean male film actors
South Korean male television actors
South Korean male models
1979 births
Living people
People from Bucheon
Hamjong Eo clan